The Tianfei Palace, officially the Mazu Cultural Palace and also known as the Tianhou Palace, is a restored temple of the Chinese sea-goddess Mazu, the deified form of the medieval Fujianese shamaness Lin Moniang, located in Fangta Park in Songjiang, Shanghai, in eastern China. Officially classified as a museum, the Tianfei Palace conducts Mazuist rites twice a year, on the traditional anniversaries of Lin Moniang's birth and death. It is also used as the site for an annual commemoration of Songjiang's city god Li Daiwen.

History
The Tianfei Palace was first erected on Henan Rd. just north of Suzhou Creek in downtown Shanghai in 1883. By that time, the traditional celebrations of Mazu's temple festival during the week of the 23rd day of the third lunar month had already been curtailed. It was the last of Shanghai's Mazu temples to be destroyed.

Following on the heels of a renovation of Songjiang's Square Pagoda in the mid-1970s, Feng Jizhong conceived of the idea of creating a park around it to celebrate traditional Chinese architecture after the ravages of the Cultural Revolution. As part of his design for Fangta Park, he sought to relocate and rebuild the ruins of the old Mazu temple. However, because Mazuism is not officially recognized as either Taoist or Buddhist, Chinese law considers it a tolerable but illegal cult and—at minimum—requires local government to demonstrate strong local demand for new temples before allowing their construction. Songjiang figured that only about 10% of its population was religious in any sense and only a few migrants adhered to Mazuism anywhere within Shanghai; nonetheless they were able to approve the plan as the Mazu Cultural Palace, a restoration of a historical monument under the auspices of the Ministry of Culture and the management of the Parks Department. The temple was moved in 1978 and initial repairs completed by 1980. It was protected by the district-level government in October 1993.

Another reason for Songjiang's approval of the temple was the belief that the presence of a temple to Mazu—a very popular deity on Taiwan—would encourage investment from Chinese businessmen there. One such businessman even funded completing the temple's restoration in 2001, allowing it to be fully opened in 2002. It was protected by Shanghai's municipal government in April 2014.

Architecture
It includes authentic and restored Qing-era architectural forms, carvings, and inscriptions, including calligraphy by Chen Peiqiu, Wu Jianxian (Wú Jiànxián),  and Zhou Huijun (Zhōu Huìjùn).

Services
The temple includes an altar, burning incense, and recorded chanting but is unregistered with the religious authorities, it lacks a permanent priest, and all ticket proceeds benefit the parks department. For Mazuist immigrants and tourists, the Tianfei Palace hires Fujianese priests to visit and conduct religious services twice a year, on the traditional anniversaries of Lin Moniang's birth and death. Without condoning the quasi-legal cult, the park workers consider that "this is just good business".

The temple is also the site of an unrelated annual commemoration of the birth of Li Daiwen (Lǐ Dāiwèn), a Ming official who unsuccessfully resisted the Qing invasion of the area but became celebrated as one of Songjiang's city gods. Thousands of bowls of soy milk and youtiao are distributed to those who gather to burn incense in his honor. Because the celebration follows the Chinese lunar calendar, its date (18/6) varies from year to year in the Gregorian system.

See also
 List of Mazu temples

Notes

References

Citations

Bibliography
 . 
 .
 .

External links
 . 

Government buildings completed in 1980
Religious buildings and structures completed in 2002
Museums in Shanghai
Religious buildings and structures in Shanghai
Mazu temples